Dycladia lydia is a moth of the subfamily Arctiinae. It was described by Druce in 1900. It is found in southern Brazil.

References

Euchromiina
Moths described in 1900